The South Schleswig Voters' Association (SSW) is a regionalist political party in Schleswig-Holstein in northern Germany. The party represents the Danish and Frisian minorities of the state.

As a party representing a national minority, the SSW declines to identify itself with a scale of left–right politics but models its policies on the Nordic model, which often means favouring a strong welfare state, while favouring a more free-market labour policy than the German social market economy model. The SSW is represented in the Landtag of Schleswig-Holstein and several regional and municipal councils. The party contested federal elections in Germany until 1961, before returning in 2021, where it obtained one seat.

As a party for the national Danish minority in Southern Schleswig, the SSW is not subject to the general requirement of passing a 5% vote threshold to gain proportional seats in either the state parliament (Landtag) or the federal German parliament (Bundestag). In the most recent 2022 state election, the SSW received 5.7% of the votes and four seats. In the 2021 federal elections, the SSW stood in a federal election for the first time since 1961; the official final result gave them one seat, making Stefan Seidler a Member of Parliament, their first such member since the 1953 federal elections.

History
In the 2005 state election the SSW received 3.6% (two seats). This was enough for the SSW to hold the balance of power between the national parties of the left and right, and the SSW chose to support a coalition of the Social Democratic Party of Germany (SPD) and The Greens, without joining the coalition itself. This resulted in criticism from the Christian Democratic Union (CDU) and from German national conservative circles, who asserted that since the SSW had been granted a special status, it was obliged to defend only minority interests, and that its status should be revoked if the SSW behaved like a "regular" party. The SSW representatives, however, insisted on the full value of their parliamentary seats and their equal rights as German citizens. One particular point was that the SSW had taken a strong position on educational principles in the state (abolishing the traditional German system of dividing pupils according to academic ability already after the 4th grade into different types of secondary schools). The CDU argued that since there were separate Danish-language schools, it was unreasonable for the SSW to involve itself in the affairs of the public schools.

As the planned SPD-Greens coalition did not make it into office after the 2009 state election, a centre-right coalition was formed between the CDU and Free Democratic Party (FDP), and the SSW joined the opposition.

In the 2012 state election, the SSW gained 4.6% of all votes and three seats in the state Landtag. A coalition of the SPD, Greens and SSW was concluded in June 2012, and the former parliamentary leader, Anke Spoorendonk, was appointed Minister for Culture, Justice and European Affairs. This was the first time in German history that a minority party had participated in a state government. The new coalition government had plenty of nicknames, for instance "Dänen-Ampel" ("Dane-traffic light"), "Schleswig-Holstein-Ampel", "rot-grün-blaue Koalition" or "rød-grøn-blå koalition" (red–green–blue alliance), "Küstenkoalition" (Coastal alliance) and "Nord-Ampel" (North traffic light).

In the 2017 state election, the SSW backed to 3.3% of the votes, but retained three seats in the Landtag. However, since the government coalition parties lost their Landtag majority, a new government was formed without the SSW, which again joined the opposition.

Exempt from the threshold of 5%,  it won a seat in the 2021 German federal election with 0.1% of the vote nationwide, its first federal seat since the inaugural 1949 West German federal election. Though unlikely to change the balance of power in any way, Stefan Seidler will sit as its Member of the German Bundestag.

SSWUngdom
The Youth in the SSW (Danish: SSWUngdom, German: Jugend im SSW) is the youth wing of the South Schleswig Voter Federation. The current chairman is Maylis Roßberg.

Electoral results

Bundestag election results

Landtag election results

Leadership

Leader of the SSW

Notes

References

External links
 SSW in English
 Youth in the SSW Website

Political parties of minorities in Germany
Regional parties in Germany
Politics of Schleswig-Holstein
European Free Alliance
1948 establishments in Germany
Danish minority of Southern Schleswig
Political parties established in 1948